ПКП is a Cyrillic acronym that may refer to:

 Communist Party of Pridnestrovie
 Pridnestrovie Communist Party
 Tsveta Karayancheva, a Chairperson of the National Assembly of Bulgaria